James Bradley Reavis (May 27, 1848 –  April 29, 1912) was a justice of the Washington Supreme Court from January 11, 1897 to January 13, 1903, serving as chief justice in 1901.

Born in Boone County, Missouri, Reavis graduated from the University of Kentucky in 1872, and practiced law in Hannibal, Missouri, and Chico, California, before moving to the Territory of Washington in 1880. He was a member of the territorial council and regent of the University of Washington from 1888 to 1889, prior to statehood. He was elected to the state supreme court as a Democrat.

Reavis married Minnie Freeman in 1891. He died at the age of 64, at the Washington State Asylum for the Insane in Steilacoom, Washington, where he had been confined for roughly three years.

References

1848 births
1912 deaths
People from Boone County, Missouri
University of Kentucky alumni
Regents of the University of Washington
Justices of the Washington Supreme Court
Washington (state) Democrats